The United Arab Emirates national football team represents United Arab Emirates in international football and serves under the auspices of the country's Football Association.

It has made one World Cup appearance in 1990 in Italy and lost all three of its games. United Arab Emirates took fourth place in the 1992 Asian Cup and runner-up in 1996 as host. It won the Arabian Gulf Cup in 2007 and 2013. It finished third in the 2015 AFC Asian Cup and hosted the 2019 edition in which it was eliminated in the semi-finals.

History
The first match of the team was played on 17 March 1972 against Qatar at Prince Faisal bin Fahd Stadium and won with the only goal scored by Ahmed Chowbi. Then, the team faced three other Arabian countries, losing 4–0 and 7–0 to Saudi Arabia and Kuwait respectively and beating Bahrain 3 to nothing. After participating in four Gulf Cup tournaments since 1972, United Arab Emirates (UAE) hosted the 1982 edition. It again finished third as did in the two previous tournaments.

In 1980, United Arab Emirates first-time qualified for the AFC Asian Cup which was held in Kuwait and were drawn with eventual winners, Kuwait, runner-up South Korea, Malaysia and Qatar in Group B. It drew 1–1 with Kuwait and lost the three other matches and finished in fifth place in the group and ninth (out of ten teams) overall. It also qualified for the next two tournaments, 1984 in Singapore and 1988 in Qatar and was again eliminated in the group stages in both. Its first victory of the tournament occurred against India on 7 December 1984, under manager Heshmat Mohajerani.

In 1984, Mohajerani resigned and was replaced with Carlos Alberto Parreira. Parreira led the team at the 1988 Asian Cup and left his position after the tournament. He was succeeded by Mário Zagallo. Zagallo led the team to the qualification for the 1990 World Cup in Italy. However, Zagallo resigned before the tournament and Parreira returned. The team finished fourth at the 1990 World Cup's final tournament with no points, scoring two goals and conceding 11 goals. The journey was put into a 2016 documentary titled Lights of Rome. After the tournament, Parreira was sacked.

At the 1992 and 1996 Asian Cups, United Arab Emirates finished fourth and second respectively for the first times. United Arab Emirates appeared in the 1997 FIFA Confederations Cup after being awarded a spot because Saudi Arabia was hosting the games.

United Arab Emirates missed the qualification for the 2000 AFC Asian Cup in Lebanon and finished in last place at the 2002 Gulf Cup in Saudi Arabia. It was eliminated in the next three Asian Cup tournaments at the group stage. In 2004 and 2007 editions, UAE was all eliminated by the hand to debutants Jordan and Vietnam. In 2011, it finished the tournament goalless. At this time, coaches that managed the Emirates included Carlos Queiroz, Roy Hodgson and Dick Advocaat. In 2006, UAE appointed Bruno Metsu as the new manager. He led the Emirates to the 2007 Gulf Cup title.

After hiring foreign coaches, in 2012, United Arab Emirates appointed the Olympic team coach Mahdi Ali as the manager of the senior team. Ali began creating a squad inviting players that he had worked with at the youth level. He led the Emirates to their second Gulf Cup title in 2013. At the 2015 AFC Asian Cup, United Arab Emirates defeated Qatar 4–1 and Bahrain 2–1 and lost to Iran by a goal. As group runner-up, it faced the defending champions Japan in the quarter-final and earned a victory on penalties to advance to the last four. In the semi-finals, it lost 2–0 to the host Australia. In the third-place play-off, it beat Iraq 3–2. United Arab Emirates qualified through the AFC qualification where it finished fourth in Group B thus failing to qualify for the 2018 FIFA World Cup. Ahmed Khalil was a top scorer in the qualification. Around this time Mahdi Ali resigned from his position.

The Emirates hosted the 2019 Asian Cup, this marked the second time they hosted an AFC Asian Cup. The team had Alberto Zaccheroni as a coach. In the Asian Cup tournament, UAE proceeded to the quarter-finals where it scored its first-ever goal against Australia to gain its first-ever win against this opponent. The semi-finals was between the host and Qatar. Some audiences threw footwear in the pitch after Qatar scored its second goal. UAE lost 0–4 marking its first defeat to Qatar since 2001.

United Arab Emirates joined the second round of 2022 World Cup qualifiers and was placed with all-out Southeast Asian opponents. The team had already appointed the Dutch guider Bert van Marwijk. Bert was sacked after his start undergoing two away losses to Thailand and Vietnam in the qualifiers along his group stage exit in the 24th Arabian Gulf Cup. After this, the Emirates decided to naturalize Argentine Sebastián Tagliabúe, Brazilian Caio Canedo Corrêa and Fábio Virginio de Lima, the three South American players, having never done so since the foundation of the national team. The team then experienced a period of coaching instabilities, with three different coaches, before van Marwijk resumed his duty due to crisis in option. With the COVID-19 pandemic however, the AFC decided the remaining games of the second round would be played in one country, and the United Arab Emirates were able to utilise the advantage as the host nation, ultimately u-turned the earlier misery into four consecutive wins to break through into the third round, where they faced its neighbours and the powerhouses Iran and South Korea. In the third round, the UAE failed to produce a promising performance after winning just one out of six first games, a 1–0 away win over Lebanon, drew three and lost two, adding with the UAE's below average performance in the 2021 FIFA Arab Cup despite reaching the quarter-finals, that was enough to sack the Dutch manager van Marwijk yet again. After inconsistency in performance, the UAE appointed Argentine manager Rodolfo Arruabarrena as coach, and the team's result improved, winning two out of four games, notably an impressive 1–0 home win over already-qualified South Korea, to reach the fourth round, increased hope for the country to qualify for the first-ever World Cup since 1990, where they would face the old foe Australia, whom the UAE defeated in the latest meeting. However, the UAE was unable to utilise their geographical advantage in the playoff in neighbouring Qatar, losing 1–2 to Australia by a thunderous strike at 84' by Ajdin Hrustic to deny the UAE's its potential second appearance; they later stunned South America's rising power Peru to qualify for the edition.

Rivalries
UAE's common rivals are Saudi Arabia, Qatar, Oman, and Iran.

Qatar

The rivalry with Qatar is a competitive one in the Arabian Gulf Cup meeting in multiple occasions, due to Qatar diplomatic crisis, increasing tensions had been witnessed, with the captain of UAE under-19 youth team refused to shake hands with Qatar's youth captain in 2018 AFC U-19 Championship held in Indonesia; in this tournament, the UAE beat Qatar 2–1 but still crashed out from the group stage while Qatar would recover to qualify for the 2019 FIFA U-20 World Cup. As of 2020, Qatar and UAE have played 31 official matches, most of which was held competitively in the Arabian Gulf Cup, it started off with the United Arab Emirates beating Qatar 1–0. They only played 2 friendly games and the last friendly was held in 2011 which ended with an Emirati victory. In the 2019 AFC Asian Cup, hosted by the UAE, Qatar overran the UAE for the first time since 2001 with the result 4–0, with heavy tensions and violence occurred between two and Emirati supporters cheering anti-Qatari chants.

Saudi Arabia
Another major rival the UAE takes on Arabian Gulf Cup many times, the two teams have met in the AFC Asian Cup twice, first in the semi finals of the 1992 edition which ended in a Saudi victory and second in the final of the 1996 edition in which UAE hosted, the game ended in a goalless draw which meant the game had to be decided in penalties, the game ended with Saudi Arabia taking home their 3rd title with the penalty scoreline being 4–2, this remains the only time the Emirates qualified for the final meanwhile this would also be the last time the Saudis would win an Asian Cup as they would lose the next two finals they qualified for in 2000 and 2007. When the countries meet in qualifier matches, the matchup has been nicknamed "clash of titans" as both countries have been some of the more successful teams in the Arabian Peninsula.

Nicknames
The United Arab Emirates is known by supporters and the media as Al-Abyad, meaning The Whites which reference to their white jersey and also Eyal Zayed which means Zayed's sons.

In October 2012, the Asian Football Confederation official website published an article about the UAE national team's campaign to qualify for the 2015 AFC Asian Cup, in which the team was referred to using the racial slur "sand monkey". This was the indirect result of vandalism of the Wikipedia article on the team, and the AFC was forced to apologise.

Stadium
As of 2022, UAE has played in 11 home stadiums. Most games have taken place at Sheikh Zayed Stadium in Abu Dhabi with Abu Dhabi's Al Jazira Stadium and Hazza Bin Zayed Stadium in Al Ain as other venues.

Kit
The UAE's traditional home kit is all-white with some red trim while their away kit is all-red with some white trim, in 2019, the away colors were black for the first time in addition, there were some green trim.

Results and fixtures

2022

2023

Current staff

Last Update: February 2022

Players

Current squad
 The following players were called up for the friendly matches.
 Match dates: 24 – 27 March 2023
 Opposition:  and  
 Caps and goals correct as of: 13 January 2023, after the match against 

 

 

 

  
  
 

Recent call-ups

The following players have also been called up to the squad within the last 12 months.

 

SUS Suspended
INJ Withdrew from the squad due to an injury
PRE Preliminary squad
RET Retired from international association football

List of UAE squads

FIFA World Cup 
 1990 World Cup squad

FIFA Confederations Cup 
 1997 Confederations Cup squad

AFC Asian Cup
 1980 Asian Cup squad
 1984 Asian Cup squad
 1988 Asian Cup squad
 1992 Asian Cup squad
 1996 Asian Cup squad
 2004 Asian Cup squad
 2007 Asian Cup squad
 2011 Asian Cup squad
 2015 Asian Cup squad
 2019 Asian Cup squad

Player records

Players in bold are still active with United Arab Emirates.

Most appearances

Top goalscorers

Competitive record

 Champion   Runners-up   Third place  

FIFA World Cup

AFC Asian Cup

FIFA Confederations Cup

Asian Games

West Asian Football Federation Championship

Gulf Cup

FIFA Arab Cup

Pan Arab Games

Other Tournaments

Head-to-head record

As of 13 January 2023

HonoursContinental Competitions AFC Asian CupRunner-up (1): 1996
Third place (1): 2015
Fourth place (1): 1992
Semi-finals (1): 2019Regional Competitions FIFA Arab CupFourth place (1): 1998
 Arabian Gulf CupWinners (2): 2007, 2013
Runner-up (4): 1986, 1988, 1994, 2017Minor Competitions Friendship TournamentWinners (2) 1996, 1998

 Kirin CupWinners (1): 2005

 OSN CupWinners (1): 2013

 LG CupWinners (1): 2000

 Oman Cup'Winners (1):'' 2000

Notes

References

External links

UAE Football Association official website 

 

 
Asian national association football teams
1972 establishments in the United Arab Emirates